The Dolphin 17 is an American trailerable sailboat that was designed by Glenn Corcoran and Murray Corcoran and first built in 1970.

Production
The design was initially built by Universal Plastic Products, first in Houston, Texas, United States and later in Coffeyville, Kansas when the company relocated there. It was then built by Silverline Boats in Moorhead, Minnesota, although that company closed in 1980 and the design is now out of production. A total of 740 examples of the type were completed.

Design
The Dolphin 17 is a recreational sailboat, built predominantly of fiberglass, with wood trim. It has a masthead sloop rig, including a backstay, aluminum spars, a spooned raked stem, a vertical transom, a transom-hung, kick-up fiberglass rudder controlled by a tiller with an extension and a retractable  fiberglass centerboard. Unusually, the jib is not mounted to the forestay.

For sailing the design is equipped with a self-bailing cockpit, a mainsheet traveler and a boom vang. There are three stowage lockers fitted, two on either side and one in the stern of the boat.

The design has a Portsmouth Yardstick racing average handicap of 97.8 and is normally raced with a crew of two sailors.

Variants
Dolphin 17
This open boat with a foredeck model displaces  and carries  of ballast.
Dolphin 17C
This model is equipped with a cuddy cabin with a single window per side and displaces  and carries  of ballast.

Operational history
In a 1994 review Richard Sherwood wrote, "in addition to the open design, there is a cabin model available. As might be expected, it is slightly heavier and has a reduced sail area. Capacity in either model is six adults; the cabin model sleeps two. The Dolphin 17 has covered storage on both sides of the mast, as well as aft storage."

See also
List of sailing boat types

Similar sailboats
Siren 17

References

Trailer sailers
1980s sailboat type designs
Two-person sailboats
Sailboat type designs by Glenn Corcoran
Sailboat type designs by Murray Corcoran
Sailboat types built by Silverline Boats
Sailboat types built by Universal Plastic Products